Gag Factor is a series of pornographic films made by JM Productions featuring deep throating (irrumatio). One of the films from the series is discussed in the article "A Cruel Edge: The painful truth about today's pornography, and what men can do about it" by Robert Jensen of the School of Journalism at the University of Texas that originally appeared in Ms. magazine. The article describes the female performer with "a sloppy situation" at the end of the scene, often with spit, mucus or vomit running down their faces. Jensen includes the film as an example of pornography which he describes as dangerous and denigrating to women, and indicative of the trend of presenting women as being in pain during sex.

The first film was released in 2000. The series won the AVN Award for 'Best Oral-Themed Series' in 2003 and 2004. In October 2007, one of Gag Factor distributors, Five Star DVD, was found guilty by an Arizona jury of transporting obscene materials, including a Gag Factor title, across state lines.

Videography

References

External links
 
 Gag Factor at IMDb
 Gag Factor at IAFD
 Gag Factor Series at the Adult Film Database

American pornographic films
2000s pornographic films
Fellatio
Human throat
Pornographic film series
2000s American films